The D57 class was a class of 4-8-2 steam locomotives built by Clyde Engineering for the New South Wales Government Railways in Australia. The tenders were built by Mort's Dock.

Introduction
The locomotives were among the heaviest of locomotives in Australia with a  axle load and this along with their width restricted their sphere of operation to Thirroul on the Illawarra line, Wallerawang on the Main Western line and Junee on the Main South line.

Due to the immense size of the firebox, they could not be hand fired and had to use a mechanical stoker, thus becoming the first New South Wales locomotive class to use a mechanical stoker. They were later followed by the 58 class and the 60 class

They were not permitted to operate on the Main Northern line due to load limitations on some bridges and a tighter loading gauge. They had the highest tractive effort of any conventional engines used in Australia and were of approximately equal capability to the modified 60 class Garratt locomotives. They were very reliable and had the nickname Lazy Lizzies because they made heavy workings seem effortless. Another nickname was bestowed on the class, Chuckling Charlies due to their syncopated exhaust beat.

The three cylinder design fitted to the class gave it a distinctive off-beat exhaust sound when climbing upgrade. This design was also fitted to the 58 class. However, a couple of features, such as the Gresley conjugating valve gear fitted to these locomotives has been the source of debate as to its efficiency. A further 13 were built to a similar design in 1950 as the 58 class.

Demise and Preservation
The first was withdrawn in October 1957, the last in September 1961. The last example in traffic was saved for preservation by the New South Wales Rail Transport Museum. In June 1975, 5711 was hauled from Enfield to Thirlmere by 3801. In September 2008 it was relocated to the Valley Heights Locomotive Depot Heritage Museum where it is being statically restored.

Gallery

See also
 Preserved steam locomotives of New South Wales
 NSWGR steam locomotive classification

References

Further reading

External links

4-8-2 locomotives
Clyde Engineering locomotives
Railway locomotives introduced in 1929
Standard gauge locomotives of Australia
57